The 2014 Players' Championship was held from April 15 to 20 at the Consolidated Credit Union Place in Summerside, Prince Edward Island. It was the fourth and final Grand Slam of the 2013–14 World Curling Tour.

On the men's side, Edmonton's Kevin Martin won a record eighth Players' Championship, which was his final Players' win before retirement. On the women's side, Winnipeg's Jennifer Jones won a record fifth Players' title.

Men

Teams
The teams are listed as follows:

Round-robin standings
Final round-robin standings

Round-robin results
All times listed in Atlantic Daylight Time (UTC−03).

Draw 1
Tuesday, April 15, 7:00 pm

Draw 3
Wednesday, April 16, 1:00 pm

Draw 5
Wednesday, April 16, 8:30 pm

Draw 6
Thursday, April 17, 9:30 am

Draw 7
Thursday, April 17, 1:00 pm

Draw 8
Thursday, April 17, 5:00 pm

Draw 10
Friday, April 18, 9:30 am

Draw 11
Friday, April 18, 1:00 pm

Draw 12
Friday, April 18, 5:00 pm

Draw 13
Friday, April 18, 8:30 pm

Playoffs

Quarterfinals
Saturday, April 19, 5:00 pm

Semifinals
Saturday, April 19, 8:30 pm

Final
Sunday, April 20, 5:00 pm

Women

Teams
The teams are listed as follows:

Round-robin standings
Final round-robin standings

Round-robin results
All times listed in Atlantic Daylight Time (UTC−03).

Draw 1
Tuesday, April 15, 7:00 pm

Draw 2
Wednesday, April 16, 9:30 am

Draw 4
Wednesday, April 16, 4:30 pm

Draw 6
Thursday, April 17, 9:30 am

Draw 7
Thursday, April 17, 1:00 pm

Draw 8
Thursday, April 17, 5:00 pm

Draw 9
Thursday, April 17, 8:30 pm

Draw 10
Friday, April 18, 9:30 am

Draw 11
Friday, April 18, 1:00 pm

Playoffs

Quarterfinals
Saturday, April 19, 1:00 pm

Semifinals
Saturday, April 19, 8:30 pm

Final
Sunday, April 20, 11:00 am

References

External links

Players' Championship
Players' Championship
Sport in Summerside, Prince Edward Island
Curling competitions in Prince Edward Island
Players' Championship
2014 in Prince Edward Island